The Ministry of Information and Public Relations is a ministry of the Government of Maharashtra. It is responsible for preparing annual plans for the development of Maharashtra state.

The Ministry is headed by a cabinet level Minister. Eknath Shinde is Current Minister of Information and Public Relations.

Head office

List of Cabinet Ministers

List of Ministers of State

List of Principal Secretary
Shri Sanjay Chahande, (IAS)

References

Government ministries of Maharashtra